Vaiste is a village in Lääneranna Parish, Pärnu County, in southwestern Estonia, on the coast of the Gulf of Riga. It has a population of 33 (as of 1 January 2011).

Vaiste (Waist) knight manor was established in 1661 by the owner of Vana-Varbla Manor Gustav Bauen. The latest 1-storey wooden main building was constructed in the 1880s when the owner was Roman von Nasackin. It was demolished in 1969–1970.

Ännikse–Kilgi–Vaiste railway line for lumber transport operated from 1919 to 1950.

References

External links
Website of Saulepi region (Kulli, Maade, Matsi, Õhu, Rädi, Raespa, Saare, Saulepi and Vaiste villages) 

Villages in Pärnu County
Kreis Wiek